Gimme a Break is a British children's television game show. Three series were made and were first aired on the CBBC Channel in 2008 and 2011. It was presented by Jake Humphrey, Kirsten O'Brien and Joe Swash.

Format
The show revolves around kids getting their dream holidays and forcing mum and dad to do what the kids please. It begins with them meeting the presenter and background of the family before moving on to the children guessing what the holiday choices might be using clues. They then pick one of three holidays and pack their parents suitcase before heading off. They then take part in activities in their chosen destination, before moving on to the big prize.

Presenters
Series One was presented by Jake Humphrey and due to his busy schedule with BBC Sport he was unable to return and was replaced by Kirsten O'Brien for Series Two. Series Three was presented by Joe Swash.

Episodes

Series 1
1. The Castellos – Wales: Nina & Simone
2. The Ashams – Greece: Colette & Jem
3. The Dabedeens – Croatia: Tisha & Nisha
4. The Strahans – Devon: Thomas, Fiona & Katherine
5. The Griffins – Caribbean Cruise: Joe & Jack
6. The Rooneys – Jersey: Philippa & Kristin
7. The McKinnons – France Treehouse: Sam & Josh
8. Davina and Jade – Extreme: Jade
9. The Tates – Florida Ranch: Daena & Kealan
10. The Browns – New Forest: Rosie & Elizabeth
11. The Brays – Wales: Jack & Emily
12. Gray Family: Elle & Georgia
13. Brook Family: Joseph, Daniel & Jacob

Series 2
1. Hoyles – Morocco: Grace & Jackson
2. Pearson – Wales: Molly & Louis
3. Shaw – Catalonia: Matt & Jono
4. Sandhu – Scotland: Simran, Parminder & Moneeka
5. Hudson – Sweden: Billy
6. Evan-Lainchbury – Isles of Scilly: Carys & Megan
7. Hassall – Portugal: Ellie & Matt
8. Davies – Cotswolds: Gwyndaf & Dewi
9. Mullaney – Turks and Caicos: Hannah, Louise & Matthew
10. Latham – Sardinia: Jazz & Joe
11. Bishop – Lake District: Conor & Evie
12. Marshall – Finland: Jack & Tom
13. Vasudevan – Switzerland: Olivia, Millie & Martha

Series 3
1. Trivedi Family: Cheyan & Jenna
2. Britner Family: Jake & Laila
3. Williams Family: Candace & Clarke
4. Harris-Willis Family: Callum & Jack
5. Prince-Tappe Family: Aran & Alice
6. Lucas Family: Rachel
7. Scaife Family: Molly & Ally
8. Sims Family: Alannah & Marissa
9. Anderson Family: Lucy, Ellie & William
10. Field Family: Max, Molly & Katie
11. Meeson Family: Alfie & Jesse
12. Perks Family: Beth & Megan
13. Campbell Family: Kaitlyn & Callie

Series guide

External links

BBC children's television shows
2000s British children's television series
2000s British game shows
2008 British television series debuts